Arion Gesangverein is a German American musical organization.

History
It was founded in 1850. It was one of a number of important cultural organizations created beginning in the late 1840s, which helped German culture survive and disseminate after a wave of immigration to the United States. It claims to be "one of the oldest singing societies in the United States". It was named after the Greek poet-musician  Arion.

Arion performs regularly in the Baltimore and Washington areas. The group has also performed at a reception honoring Ludwig Kossuth, and at the dedication of the Gettysburg National Cemetery. Arion Gesangverein has continued to perform at the Gettysburg Cemetery's anniversaries, most recently in 1988.

Awards
In 1950, the organization won the Zelter-Plakette award, given out by the Deutscher Saengerbund.

References

Notes

Music organizations based in the United States
German-American culture in Maryland
German-American organizations
Musical groups established in 1850